The Oz Kids is an American direct-to-video animated fantasy comedy-drama series produced by Hyperion Animation based on The Wizard of Oz, L. Frank Baum's 1900 children's novel, and its various sequels. Nine episodes were released between October 1, 1996 and February 18, 1997 by Paramount Home Video.

The two main characters of this series are both human: Dot and Neddie (the children of Dorothy and Zeb). The minor characters are Boris and Bela (the children of the Cowardly Lion), Tin Boy (the son of the Tin Woodman), Scarecrow Jr. (the son of the original Scarecrow), Jack Pumpkinhead Jr. (the son of the original Jack Pumpkinhead), Frank, (the son of the Wizard), and Andrea, (the daughter of Glinda).

Characters

Main
 Dot Hugson (voiced by Julianne Michelle): Dorothy and Zeb's tomboyish 8-year-old daughter, and Neddie's fun-loving older sister. She is a spunky and energetic young girl from rural Kansas and the leader of the Oz Kids. She is fearless and level-headed when in a dangerous situation, able to analyze the options and act accordingly, and consistently triumphs with imagination. Dot's parents are Dorothy Gale and Zeb Hugson. Dorothy first came to Oz as a young girl. Her adventures were recounted in The Wizard of Oz. As an adult, Dorothy married her cousin, Zeb Hugson and eventually had two children, Dot and Neddie. On a summer day, Dot has spent her entire childhood in the Kansas farmhouse. She enjoys hanging out with boys, riding horses, playing pranks, daydreaming and having fun. That is, until Dot, Neddie and their family are picked up by the tornado and magically transported to Oz. Although she is happy, sweet and well-adjusted, she yearns to learn more about the outside world. Dot instigates many of the trips beyond Oz. After each adventure with her friends, however, she is very happy to return to Oz, to her home. She is very protective of her younger brother, Neddie. She gains her magic belt that gives her magical powers. Fair skinned with freckles, Dot has brown hair tied back into two pigtails with blue bows and wears a white shirt with short puffy sleeves, a sleeveless blue dress, white bloomers, white socks, and black Mary Jane shoes. Before the beginning of each episode of the series, Dot narrates the monologue about she, Neddie and her family transported to Oz, after they're caught up in the tornado.
 Neddie Hugson (voiced by Eric Lloyd): Dorothy and Zeb's 5-year-old son and Dot's charming little brother. He is a young boy shares many of his lovely sister's characteristics, he is inquisitive and energetic, but his lack of savvy often gets him into trouble. Neddie is trusting sometimes too trusting and is easily impressionable. Neddie's personality is in a constant state of evolution. Neddie is often in a quandary as to what is the proper route of action but, through his sister's guidance, and his own internal system of weighing right and wrong, he ultimately always acts judiciously.
 Toto (voiced by Frank Welker): He is Dot and Neddie's black Cairn Terrier, named after Dorothy's dog.

Supporting
Scarecrow Jr. (voiced by Jonathan Taylor Thomas and Scott McAfee): He is the son of the Scarecrow who first encountered Dorothy in a corn field and desiring a brain more than anything, was given one by the Wizard of Oz. The Scarecrow now rules the Emerald City. Unlike his father at this age, Scarecrow Jr. is overly confident of his intellect, as he believes as he always has an answer for everything. Scarecrow Jr. is something of a boy genius, but his intellect is more advanced than his emotions. He can be very childish when he doesn't get his own way or when he believes that his friends are not listening to him. Scarecrow Jr. analyzes every situation carefully and always has a plan of action. Often, however, Scarecrow Jr. is not open to the ideas or opinions of others, he is something of a know-it-all. Scarecrow Jr.'s intractability results in humorous conflict with his friends, many of his ideas backfire. Scarecrow Jr. discovers that his ideas are best implemented and is at his most successful when he is a team-player.
Tin Boy (voiced by Benjamin Salisbury): He is the son of the Tin Woodman who met Dorothy on the road to Oz and was given a heart by the Wizard of Oz. The Tin Woodman rules the Winkie Country, west of Emerald City. Tin Boy is particularly good with his hands he has a decidedly mechanical nature. He can construct and/or fix almost anything. Tin Boy is a very emotional character, he empathizes, often in the extreme, with the problems of others. Tin Boy is very trusting, he looks for the good in everyone, and is often exploited because of it.
Boris and Bela (voiced by Bradley Pierce (Boris) and Shayna Fox (Bela): They are lion cubs, the children of the once-Cowardly Lion. The Cowardly Lion rules the kingdom to the south of Emerald City, Quadling Country. Genetically, Boris and Bela are twins but they couldn't be more different in personality.
Boris is very shy and gentle, easily intimidated and frightened. Older than Bela by 12 seconds. When pushed to the limit, however, Boris always comes through. Boris often surprises his more aggressive sister, and himself, with his courage. Boris likes music and is constantly whistling or humming, often seeming to be lost in daydreams.
Bela is a very aggressive, very vocal lion cub, she can be something of a brat and a bully. Younger than Boris by 12 seconds. Bela always wants to be in charge, and thinks that her way is best, but she is often shown-up by her friends. Bela tries to project a certain air of superiority but, underneath, she has the same insecurities as other children of her age. Bela's bravura gets her into trouble, her lack of experience often resulting in her being unable to pull herself out of it. Bela is often embarrassed by the affection she feels for others, particularly Boris, and has trouble expressing her feelings.
Jack Pumpkinhead Jr. (voiced by Aaron Michael Metchik): He is the son of his namesake, his father is a gentle elder of Emerald City who serves beside the Scarecrow. Jack is a somewhat fragile young man and is very fastidious, he doesn't like to soil his hands or his clothes. Jack's obsession with cleanliness borders upon the charmingly neurotic and, of course, through circumstances, he often gets dirty than any of his friends. He often surprises his friends with his solid solutions to the problems which confront them.
Frank (voiced by Alex Zuckerman): He is the son of the Wizard of Oz. His father, who now lives in Oz and works closely with the Scarecrow, is a widower. Frank was born outside of Oz and, at 10, is the oldest of the children. Frank is very much his father's son, blustery and something of a charlatan. Frank is the most eager to embark upon the kids' many exciting, and potentially-dangerous, excursions. Frank has scientist learnings, he is an inventor with an invention for almost any occasion. Of all the children in Oz, Frank most desires to return, permanently, to the real world. Once there, however, most of his experiences make him yearn for home. Frank straddles the fence between desiring the security of home, Oz, and wanting to strike out on his own.
Andrea (voiced by Shay Astar): She is the daughter of Glinda, the Good Witch of the South. Andrea is quite beautiful, gentle and very aware of it. Andrea is not a witch but is a character always in conflict—she has magic abilities but isn't always certain how best to use them. Andrea is confident of her powers and likes to use them to her advantage. She is the least adept socially of the group and, often, she feels excluded from their activities. When she feels excluded, she often retaliates with some sort of magical prank. Andrea is a troublemaker but, at heart, really only wants to feel included. When pressed, Andrea is able to use her magic to help the group out of a mix-up—a mix-up which, more likely than not, she was the cause of. Her outfit is similar to Princess Ozma. Unlike Dot Hugson, a tomboyish farm girl who loves hanging out with boys and having fun, Andrea is a girly witch, who enjoys cleaning, doing magic tricks and anything else girly. Relies more on her magic than her brains, but when she can't resort to her wand, she puts her mind to work.
Dorothy Hugson (voiced by Erika Schickel): Dot and Neddie's mother and Zeb's wife.
Zeb Hugson (voiced by Ross Maplettoft): Dot and Neddie's father and Dorothy's husband.
Scarecrow Sr. (voiced by Andy Milder): Scarecrow Jr.'s father.
Tin Woodman (voiced by Steve Stoliar): Tin Boy's father.
Cowardly Lion: Boris and Bela's father.
Jack Pumpkinhead Sr. (voiced by Ross Maplettoft): Jack Pumpkinhead Jr.'s father.
The Wizard of Oz (voiced by Steve Stoliar): Frank's father.
Glinda (voiced by Erika Schickel): Andrea's mother.
Scraps (voiced by Lori Alan): Has numerous infant patchwork kids, including a baby girl, Betty.
Betty: Patchwork Girl's baby daughter.
Rick (voiced by Lawrence Tierney (1996) and James Keane (1997)): When first encountered, Rick is a homeless man living on the streets of Manhattan. He comes to the aid of the Oz children and they ask him to return to Oz with them. Once there, Rick finds the home, and friends, he has always desired. Rick is a man the world has treated unkindly but his response, in return, has never been one of anger or bitterness. He has always felt himself an outsider, until he came to Oz. Rick serves as a sort of advisor to the Scarecrow, he is very adept at solving disputes between citizens. Rick is very childlike and, because of this, is able to easily enter a child's world. Of all the adults in Oz, Rick feels the closest kinship with the children, he is often included in activities that, normally, adults would be excluded from or have little interest in. Rick is very grateful to the children for his new home and position, and is always eager to lend a hand in making their lives more enjoyable. Rick is quite resourceful whenever he finds the children in any sort of danger, he will come to their aid with great vigor.
Santa Claus (voiced by Marc Allen Lewis): A man who delivers presents on Christmas for boys and girls every year. He is kidnapped by two Awgwas along with Boris. So one of Santa's elves and the Oz Kids went to rescue them. The Oz Kids told him to come celebrate in the Land of Oz. When Santa arrived in Oz everyone celebrates and at the end he went home to deliver presents for all little boys and girls.
Toby (voiced by Jarrett Lennon): A young flying monkey.
Gumpette (voiced by Jason Renfro): A counterpart of the Gump, the kids often use him to fly because the Gump has left for a dentist appointment. The Gumpette has a Pat Buttram-sounding voice.

Villains
Mombi (voiced by Darlene Cornley) is a bad witch who was banished for years and came back. She is trying to take over the land of Oz and stole Dot's magic belt so she can have everything she wants. But at the end she drank the forbidden water and can't remember everything. So the Oz Kids told her that she is a kind lady who loves children and lives in a wonderful castle. And so she became friends with the children.
Otto (voiced by Chauncey Leopardi) is the son of the Nome King. His father once tried to take over Oz but was outwitted by Dorothy and her companions and banished to an underground world below Oz. Otto desires vengeance for what he sees as wrongs done to his father by the Oz establishment. Otto lives in the cave and is told repeatedly by his father not to venture out or he's going to be grounded—advice he usually ignores. He slinks out on many occasions to cause as much trouble for the other children of Oz as possible. Otto often tries to turn the children against each other and is particularly interested in convincing Andrea to team up with him. Otto is usually outwitted in his attempts to wreak havoc but he always has another plan-of-attack waiting in the wings.

Additional voices
 Steve Stoliar – Hammerhead #1, Hammerhead #3, Joe, George the Bear, Husband, and Pilot
 Lori Alan – Mother, and Wife
 Lacey Chabert – Merla
 Scott McAfee – Scarecrow Jr. (1996–1997 and singing voice only in Christmas in Oz)
 Erika Schickel – Mother Crab and Mouse Queen
 Marc Allen Lewis – The Nome King, Hammerhead #2, Sea Dragon, and King Anko
 Andy Milder – Tommy Qwickstep, Snicklefritz, Vendor, Barnabas, Gwig, Octopus, and Yell-Maker
 Remy Ryan – Angie and Harriet
 Jarrett Lennon – Munchkin #1, Munchkin #3, Fred, Dragonettes, Pinkie the Bear, Pig, and Sacho
 Ross Maplettoft – Zog, Monkey King, Woozy, and Guards
 Claudia Christian – Queen Aquarine
 Art Chudabala – Wu Chen
 Johnathan Charles Kaplan – Monkey Prince and Freddie
 Ashley Malinger – Daughter and Clia
 Billy Mumy – Sam
 La Crystal Cooke – Henna
 Brian Ito – Hiro
 Miko Hughes – Teddy Bear
 Gabrielle Boni – Munchkin #2
 Michael Cade – Dungy
 John Link Graney – Billy
 Gavin Harrison – Crusty
 Peter MacNicol – Ork
 Frank Welker – Toto, Kalidahs (in The Nome Prince and the Magic Belt) and Dog-fish (in Journey Beneath the Sea) (uncredited)

Episodes

See also
 Adaptations of The Wizard of Oz – other adaptations of The Wonderful Wizard of Oz

References

External links

The Oz Kids Website (Archived) at Munchkinland.com
 

Direct-to-video television series
1996 American television series debuts
1997 American television series endings
1990s American animated television series
1990s American comedy-drama television series
American children's animated adventure television series
American children's animated comedy television series
American children's animated drama television series
American children's animated fantasy television series
Animated television series about children
Animated television series about dogs
Animated television series about siblings
American television shows based on children's books
Animated television series based on The Wizard of Oz
Television series by Hyperion Pictures